Johnny Temple (October 18, 1906 – November 22, 1968) was an American Chicago blues guitarist and singer, who was active in the 1930s and 1940s. He was variously billed as Johnny Temple, Johnnie Temple and Johnnie "Geechie" Temple.

Life and career
Temple was born in Canton, Mississippi, and grew up around Jackson. He learned to play guitar and mandolin as a child and began playing house parties as a teenager. While in Jackson he befriended Skip James. He moved to Chicago in the early 1930s and started playing with Joe McCoy in clubs. Temple began recording songs such as "The Evil Devil Blues" and "Lead Pencil Blues" in 1935. His most popular record, "Louise Louise Blues," released by Decca Records, was a hit in 1936. The Harlem Hamfats, a Chicago jazz band formed in 1936, provided backup music for Temple and other singers. By 1940, Decca had released two dozen of his records.

Temple continued recording with various labels through most of the 1940s. His connection with the record producer Mayo Williams provided him with recording opportunities until 1949. After World War II, Temple played an important role in welcoming blues musicians who arrived from the South. Though his recording career ended, he continued to perform gigs, often alongside Big Walter Horton and Billy Boy Arnold. He returned to Mississippi in the mid-1950s, where he continued to perform in clubs and juke joints in and around Jackson.

Temple eventually gave up the blues to become a minister. He died of cancer on November 22, 1968, aged 62, in Jackson.

Discography

Selected discography

References

External links
[ Johnny "Geechie" Temple (All-Music Guide)]
 Illustrated Johnny Temple discography

1906 births
1968 deaths
American blues singers
American blues guitarists
American male guitarists
American blues pianists
American male pianists
African-American guitarists
Chicago blues musicians
East Coast blues musicians
Deaths from cancer in Mississippi
Blues musicians from Mississippi
20th-century American guitarists
20th-century African-American male singers
Guitarists from Illinois
Guitarists from Mississippi
20th-century American male musicians
20th-century American pianists
African-American pianists